Diana Starkova (Miss France) was crowned as Miss Europe 2016 during spectacular event with more than 30 national winners from different countries. This was the 59th edition of the Miss Europe pageant and the first edition under the newly formed Miss Europe Organization. The winner was crowned with tiara signed by Chopard which is set with 678 diamonds mounted on 130 grams of gold and estimated 350 000 EUR. With the title Starkova received a contract of 2 500 000 EUR and professional representation by the Miss Europe Organization, tiara with 678 diamonds mounted on 130 grams of gold signed by Chopard and estimated 350 000 EUR, diamond jewelry set matching to the crown and watch by Chopard, 650 000 EUR cash prize, one-year supply of haircare products and tools from Kerastase Haircare, a shoe wardrobe from Christian Louboutin, swimwear by La Perla, extensive travel representing sponsors, private jet transportation for one year, evening gown wardrobe by Lebanese designer Elie Saab, a year's worth of skincare products from La Prairie Skincare.

Results

Placements

References

External links
 

Miss Europe 2016